Yongan Market (formerly transliterated as Yung-An Market Station until 2003) is a metro station in New Taipei, Taiwan served by the Taipei Metro.

Station overview
This four-level, underground station has two stacked side platforms (a split platform configuration) and one exit. The platforms are aligned parallel to one another.

Station layout

Exits
Single Exit: Zhonghe Rd.

Around the station
Northern Regional Office of Taiwan Water Corp.
National Taiwan Library
823 Memorial Park
Yongan Market

References

Railway stations opened in 1998
Zhonghe–Xinlu line stations